The Motorola Razr (2019) (stylized motorola razr, also known as RAZR 2019) is an Android foldable smartphone produced by Motorola Mobility. Unveiled on November 14, 2019, it was released on February 6, 2020. The device is designed to be reminiscent of the original Motorola Razr feature phone series and features a horizontally foldable screen (in contrast to other recent folding smartphones which are designed to be folded vertically).

Specifications 
The Razr is inspired heavily by the original feature phone line of the same name, and uses a clamshell design to conceal a 6.2-inch 21:9 OLED display. The device's exterior features a secondary 2.7-inch "Quick View" display to access selected features (such as notifications) when the device is closed. The screen is protected by a stainless-steel frame, is "scuff resistant", and has no visible crease at its folding point, with a fingerprint sensor located in the lower bezel. In response to concerns surrounding the Galaxy Fold, Motorola stated that it had "full confidence" in the durability of the phone's screen, that it would last the "average lifespan of a smartphone", and that they were "not going to go out there and say, consumers should be cautious of how they use the phone". The device was initially sold in a black finish. A second "Blush Gold" option was announced in February 2020. The Razr does not support physical SIM cards, and requires use of eSIM.

It is powered by the Qualcomm Snapdragon 710 system-on-chip and Adreno 616 GPU, with 6 GB of RAM and 128 GB of non-expandable internal storage. It uses two batteries which have a total capacity of 2510 mAh, and fast charging is supported at up to 15W over USB-C. A single camera is present on the rear with a 16 megapixel  lens, while the front-facing camera has a 5 megapixel  lens and is housed within a notch at the top of the display.

The Razr shipped with Android 9.0 "Pie", and received an update for Android 10 in mid-May 2020, adding theme support (carried over from the Motorola Edge+) and additional functionality to the Quick View display, such as virtual keyboard support, video calling, and Google Maps support. Motorola committed to supporting Android 11 as well. The software has a "Retro Razr" mode easter egg which changes the home screen to a recreation of the menu screen and keypad of the original Razr series.

Razr 5G 
In September 2020, Motorola released an updated revision of the Razr branded as the Razr 5G, also known as Razr2 (5G), Razr 2 (5G), Razr (2nd gen) (5G). Its design is nearly identical to the original model, but the fingerprint reader is re-located to the rear of the device. It now uses a Snapdragon 765G system-on-chip, with 8 GB of RAM and support for sub-6 GHz 5G wireless networks. Its cameras were also upgraded, with a 20 megapixel front-facing camera, and 48-megapixel rear-facing camera with laser autofocus and optical image stabilization. In the United States, the Razr 5G is exclusive to AT&T Mobility and T-Mobile.

Reception
The Razr was met with mixed reviews at launch, with several reviewers making comparisons to the Samsung Galaxy Z Flip. Common criticisms included the price, poor battery life and camera, sub-flagship level performance, Verizon exclusivity and bloatware, and an unrefined hinge and display, while praise went to the compact form factor, retro design and stock software. Patrick Holland of CNET gave the device a 7.5/10, praising the design, form factor and usability. Holland was impressed with the secondary Quick View display, but noted that the wide aspect ratio caused pillarboxing for apps and movies, and that the user interface was not well optimized for one-handed use. Sascha Segan of PC Magazine gave the device a 2.5/5, additionally panning the device for weak wireless performance, concluding that "Motorola's gorgeous folding Razr doesn't deliver the performance you expect from a $1,500 phone". 

Julian Chokkattu of Wired gave the Razr a 4/10, stating that "Motorola's first foldable smartphone makes a good case for the return of the clamshell design, but the Razr is still stuck in the past". Dieter Bohn of The Verge gave the device a 4/10, stating that "if this phone didn't fold, I wouldn't recommend it at one-sixth of its current price". Adam Ismail of Tom's Guide likewise stated that “[the Razr’s] myriad shortcomings — from its fragility, to its performance, to its camera and battery life — mean it's not worth the $1,500 plunge.”

iFixit gave the Razr a repairability score of 1/10, deeming it "the most complicated phone-based contraption we've ever taken apart".

Versions
This information may be incomplete

See also 
Huawei Mate X
Xiaomi Mi MIX Alpha
Samsung Galaxy Z Flip

References

External links 
 

Mobile phones introduced in 2019
Motorola smartphones
Android (operating system) devices
Foldable smartphones
Dual screen phone
Flip phones